The Liverpool Tramways Company was operated horse-drawn tramway services in Liverpool from 1869 to 1898.

History

In 1868 the Liverpool Tramway Company obtained permission to construct an Inner Circle line and lines to Walton and Dingle. Services started at 08.00 on 1 November 1869.

By the end of 1875, the network of lines had reached 60.75 miles of tramway. Services were provided through a stable of 2,894 horses and 207 tramcars.

The Liverpool Tramways Company merged with the Liverpool Road and Railway Omnibus Company in 1876 to form the Liverpool United Tramways and Omnibus Company. In 1897, Liverpool Corporation acquired the company and services were continued by Liverpool Corporation Tramways.

Surviving relics

Horse car 43 is held at Wirral Tramway awaiting restoration.

See also
Merseyside Passenger Transport Executive
Merseytram - Proposal to re-introduce trams to Liverpool.

External links
Liverpool Tram Site
Merseyside Tramway Preservation Society

References

Historic transport in Merseyside
Tram transport in England
Railway companies established in 1868
British companies established in 1868
1868 establishments in England